Daniel Mark Dodds (born 17 January 2001) is an English professional footballer who plays as a defender for League Two club Hartlepool United. 

He began his career with Middlesbrough, and spent time on loan at National League North club Darlington in the first half of the 2022–23 season, before joining Hartlepool United in January 2023.

Life and career

Dodds was born in Northumberland in 2001. He played for East Northumberland under-13s in the English Schools' Football Association (ESFA) Trophy in 2013–14, and was on the books of Newcastle United as a youngster. He took up a scholarship with Middlesbrough in 2017, was a regular in the club's under-18 team throughout his first two years as well as appearing for the under-23s, and helped the under-18s reach the final of the 2018–19 Premier League Cup, in which they lost 1–0 to Manchester City.

Dodds made his debut in open-age football on 9 October 2018 when he started the 3–1 defeat away to Walsall in the EFL Trophy. When others of his group received professional contracts in 2019, he was offered a third scholarship year, but he did sign his first professional deal a year later. Although the club's strength at right back blocked his progress into the first team, he caught the eye of manager Neil Warnock, who said "I like Doddsy the right-back, I think he'll make a good living". He was a regular for the under-23s in 2020–21according to TeessideLive, he "has proven himself an exciting prospect with the ability to go both forward and defend adequately"and the club took up its option to extend his contract.

After his 2021–22 season was disrupted by injury, Dodds signed a contract extension in June 2022. He and other academy products were used in pre-season friendlies and were included in the squad for the first-team's Portugal training camp, but manager Chris Wilder made it clear that he did not yet see them as "players who know how to win at the top end of the Championship." Dodds was one of several fringe players to make their senior debuts in Middlesbrough's EFL Cup first round defeat to Barnsley on 10 August 2022; he came on after 73 minutes and made "a couple of driving runs ... and one important late tackle".

Dodds joined National League North club Darlington on 30 September 2022 on loan until January 2023. He made his debut the next day, replacing the injured Kallum Griffiths at right back for the FA Cup third qualifying round match which Darlington lost 1–0 away to Hyde United. Dodds was a regular starter during his loan spell; he made 17 appearances in all competitions and scored his first senior goal, a "screamer from " in a 6–2 win away to Gloucester City on 10 December that took Darlington top of the table. Although Alun Armstrong wanted Dodds to stay for the rest of the season, Middlesbrough recalled him, amid speculation that he would go on loan to a team at Football League level.

On 11 January 2023, Dodds signed a permanent deal with League Two side Hartlepool United. On 4 February 2023, Dodds scored his first Hartlepool goal which was an 88th minute winner in a 1–0 win at Doncaster Rovers.

Career statistics

References

External links

2001 births
Living people
English footballers
Association football defenders
Middlesbrough F.C. players
Darlington F.C. players
Hartlepool United F.C. players
English Football League players
National League (English football) players